The Second Gyeongin Expressway (Korean: 제2경인고속도로, Je-I(2) Gyeongin Gosok Doro) is an expressway in South Korea, connecting Incheon to Seongnam. It is numbered 110 and has a length of 67.8 km. In Incheon International Airport to Hakik JC, It connected by Incheon Grand Bridge(인천대교).

History 
 19 December 1990: Construction begins.
 6 July 1994: Neunghae IC~Gwangmyeong IC segment opens to traffic.
 18 December 1995: Gwangmyeong IC~Seoksu IC segment opens to traffic.
 28 December 1998: Seoksu IC~Sammak IC segment opens to traffic.
 16 October 2009: Incheon Grand Bridge opens to traffic.
 May 2012: Seoksu IC~Seongnam JC construction begins.
 May 2017: Seoksu IC~Seongnam JC segment opens to traffic.

Compositions

Lanes 
 Ongnyeon IC~Hagik JC: 2
 Yeonsu JC~Ongnyeon IC, Seoksu IC~Sammak IC : 4
 Gonghang Newtown JC ~ Yeongjong IC, Incheon Bridge TG ~ Yeonsu JC, Neunghae IC ~ Namdong IC, Seochang JC ~ Seoksu IC : 6
 Namdong IC ~ Seochang JC : 9 (Incheon 5, Anyang 4)
 Yeongjong IC ~ Incheon Bridge TG : 10

Length 
 Total: 67.8 km
 Incheon Bridge: 19.96 km
 Neunghae~Yeosudaero: 48.6 km
 Yeonsu~Songdo: 1.03 km

Limited Speed 
 Maximum speed: 100 km/h
 Minimum speed: 50 km/h

Gallery

List of facilities 

IC: Interchange, JC: Junction, SA: Service Area, TG:Tollgate

Incheon Grand Bridge

Original Line of 2nd Gyeongin Expway

Yeonsu - Songdo section

See also
 Roads and expressways in South Korea
 Transportation in South Korea

External links
 MOLIT South Korean Government Transport Department

 
1994 establishments in South Korea
Expressways in South Korea
Roads in Incheon
Roads in Gyeonggi